= Licapeña =

Licapeña is a neighborhood in the city of Ibagué, Colombia. It is located 5 kilometers from the marketplace. It is inhabited by about 2000 people, mostly working middle class.

It was originally built in the 17th century, on swampy land.
